This article contains a list of all the episodes to the Total Drama series, a Canadian animated television show which aired on Teletoon in Canada and Cartoon Network in the United States.

As of November 20, 2014, a total of 119 episodes of the original Total Drama have been broadcast over five seasons; the 100th episode of the series was aired on February 27, 2014.

Series overview

Episodes

Season 1: Island (2007–2008)

Season 2: Action (2009–2010)

Season 3: World Tour (2010–2011)

Season 4: Revenge of the Island (2012)

Season 5: All-Stars/Pahkitew Island (2013–2014)

Spin-offs

The Ridonculous Race

Total DramaRama

Home media

Notes

References

External links

Season 1 Page Cake Entertainment
Season 2 Page Cake Entertainment
Season 3 Page Cake Entertainment
Season 4 Page Cake Entertainment
Season 5 Page Cake Entertainment
Season 6 Page Cake Entertainment

 
Lists of Canadian children's animated television series episodes